is a 1991 Japan-exclusive Game Boy Formula One video game published by Varie, endorsed by Satoru Nakajima, who was the first full-time Japanese racer in the history of Formula One. Apart from Nakajima, the actual names of the drivers are not used due to licensing arrangements.

There are sixteen rounds and eight difficulty levels. Each level has a special rival to beat. The game structure has few similarities with F-1 Race (Game Boy).

Levels/Rivals
 Level 1:  A. Susuki (Aguri Suzuki)
 Level 2:  J. Arezi (Jean Alesi)
 Level 3:  G. Bergir (Gerhard Berger)
 Level 4:  N. Pique (Nelson Piquet)
 Level 5:  N. Mansena (Nigel Mansell)
 Level 6:  A. Brost (Alain Prost)
 Level 7:  A. Zenna (Ayrton Senna)
 Level 8:  S. Nakajima

Sequel
A sequel was released in the following year: Nakajima Satoru: F-1 Hero GB '92: The Graded Driver. This game would be published by Ubisoft in North America and Europe as F1 Pole Position, otherwise unrelated to the SNES game of the same name.

References

External links
Nakajima Satoru Kanshū F-1 Hero GB at MobyGames

Related video games

Sponsored
 Nakajima Satoru: F-1 Hero (Family Computer - 1988)
 Nakajima Satoru F-1 Hero 2 (Family Computer - 1991)
 F1 Grand Prix: Nakajima Satoru (Sega Mega Drive - 1991)
 F-1 Hero MD (Sega Mega Drive - 1992)
 F1 Super License: Nakajima Satoru (Sega Mega Drive - 1992)
 Nakajima Satoru Kanshuu - F-1 Hero GB '92 - The Graded Driver (Game Boy - 1992)
 Nakajima Satoru Super F-1 Hero (Super Famicom - 1992)
 Nakajima Satoru F-1 Hero '94 (Super Famicom - 1994)
 Colin McRae Rally (European cartridge version for the NES)

Appeared in
 F-1 Pilot (cover) (PC Engine)
 F1 Circus MD (Sega Mega Drive)
 Fastest 1 (Sega Mega Drive) as S. Inakajima
 Formula One: Built to Win (Nintendo Entertainment System) as S.Nakazima
 Human Grand Prix II (Super Famicom)
 Human Grand Prix III: F1 Triple Battle (Super Famicom)
 Human Grand Prix IV: F1 Dream Battle (Super Famicom)

1991 video games
Formula One video games
Game Boy-only games
Japan-exclusive video games
Satoru Nakajima video games
Varie games
Video games set in 1991
Multiplayer and single-player video games
Game Boy games
Video games developed in Japan